The second USS Dempsey (DE-26) was an  constructed for the United States Navy during World War II. She was promptly sent off into the Pacific Ocean to protect convoys and other ships from Japanese submarines and fighter aircraft. By the end of the ship's World War II service career, when she returned to the United States, she had accumulated three battle stars.
 
Originally intended for transfer to the United Kingdom, Dempsey was launched as BDE-26 on 19 February 1943 by Mare Island Navy Yard; retained for use by the United States Navy and assigned the name Dempsey on 14 June 1943; and commissioned on 24 July 1943.

Namesake
Richard John Dempsey was born on 8 February 1919 in New York City. He was commissioned Ensign on 14 November 1940.

World War II Pacific Theatre operations

From 23 September to 25 October 1943 Dempsey escorted convoys between San Francisco, California, and Pearl Harbor. On 27 October she departed Pearl Harbor screening  to Espiritu Santo, and on 8 November she arrived at Viti Levu, Fiji Islands off which she rescued 45 survivors of the torpedoed troop ship  on 13 November. She screened oilers fueling various task units at sea during the invasion of the Gilberts, then arrived at Pearl Harbor on 2 December for repairs and training.

Dempsey sailed from Pearl Harbor on 25 January 1944 escorting a convoy of transports and cargo ships to newly captured Majuro, arriving on 3 February. She escorted  to Kwajalein, returning to Pearl Harbor on 24 February. The next day she got underway for Nouméa, arriving 8 March, and from 14 March to 22 September served in the Solomons and adjacent islands on local escort and patrol.

Transferred to the U.S. 3rd Fleet 

Transferred to the 3rd Fleet Dempsey arrived at Manus on 27 September 1944 and sailed on 2 October to screen transports to the Palaus. She patrolled and served as harbor entrance control vessel off Peleliu, on 28 October sinking a Japanese patrol craft and capturing one prisoner.
 
From 20 November 1944 Dempsey sailed on convoy duty from Guam to Eniwetok, Ulithi, and Leyte. On 15 April 1945 her base became Eniwetok, and she continued her convoy duty to Ulithi and Kwajalein, serving also on air-sea rescue patrols until 5 July when she departed for the west coast.

End-of-War decommissioning 

Arriving at San Francisco, California, on 18 July, Dempsey was decommissioned on 22 November 1945 and sold on 18 April 1947.

Awards

References

External links
 

 

Evarts-class destroyer escorts
World War II frigates and destroyer escorts of the United States
Ships built in Vallejo, California
1943 ships